WrestleRock was a  professional wrestling supercard event promoted by the American Wrestling Association (AWA). In June 2016 the event was added to the WWE Network.

Background
The event was held at the Hubert H. Humphrey Metrodome in Minneapolis, Minnesota on Sunday April 20, 1986.  The card was heavily promoted for months during weekly television programming. Although not as ambitious as the WWF's WrestleMania 2, the show was a reasonable success, drawing more fans than both of Jim Crockett Promotions' Crockett Cup shows combined.

WrestleRock would prove to be the final stadium show for the AWA.

WrestleRock Rumble
The promotions for the show included a music video shot in Las Vegas entitled the "WrestleRock Rumble" in a vein similar to "The Super Bowl Shuffle" from 1985. It featured different AWA talent "rapping" verses, including 60-year-old Verne Gagne reading his verse off a sheet. The video was parodied by the WWE online comedy show Are You Serious?, with co-host Road Dogg calling Nick Bockwinkel the best rapper of the bunch. It was then parodied as the "WrestleMania Rumble", featuring Brodus Clay, Yoshi Tatsu, Santino Marella and Puppet H doing rap verses to promote WrestleMania XXVIII.

Results

References

1986 in professional wrestling
American Wrestling Association shows
Events in Minneapolis
1986 in Minnesota
Professional wrestling in Minneapolis